American Adulterer is a 2009 novel written by Jed Mercurio focusing on the life of 35th President of the United States John Fitzgerald Kennedy. It mainly talks about his extramarital affairs, political ambitions, various physical ailments and his relationship with his wife Jackie and his children.

See also
 Unafraid: A Novel of the Possible
 The Dark Side of Camelot
 An Unfinished Life: John F. Kennedy, 1917-1963

Reference

2009 American novels
American historical novels
American political novels
Novels about politicians
Books about John F. Kennedy
Cultural depictions of John F. Kennedy
Cultural depictions of Jacqueline Kennedy Onassis
Novels set in the 1960s